Rosalind Bank, also called Rosalinda or Rosa Linda Bank, is a large, completely submerged bank or atoll in the western Caribbean Sea. It is the culmination of an area of coral reef, some 300 km (186 mi) long, that extends eastward from Cabo Gracias a Dios. The bank area is part of an extensive structure, known as Nicaragua Rise, that continues further east through Pedro Bank towards Jamaica.

Geography
Rosalind is 101 km (63 mi) long in a north-south direction, and 56 km (35 mi) wide, as defined by the 200 m (656 ft) isobath, which corresponds to an area of roughly 4,500 km2 (1,737 sq mi). General depths range from 18 to 37 m (59 to 121 ft), an almost immediate transition from the 300 m (984 ft) depth of surrounding waters. The bottom is of coarse sand and coral.

Several patches of depths from 7.3 to 11 m (24 to 36 ft) lie on a 23 km (14 mi) long coral ledge located 3 km (2 mi) within the SE edge of the bank. A detached 11 m (36 ft) patch lies near the SW edge of the bank, 21.7 km (13 mi) west of the southern end of this ledge. A depth of 10.9 m (35 ft 10 in) lies close to the northern edge of the bank.

An extensive bank 66 km (41 mi) long and 16 km (10 mi) wide, with an area of 830 km² (320 sq mi), lies 18 km (11 mi) west of Rosalind Bank. Depths over this bank range from 7 to 66 m (23 to 217 ft). The shallowest detached patches are found along the eastern edge of the bank. A detached 11 m (36 ft) patch lies on the northern part of the bank. 6 km (4 mi) further west lies Thunder Knoll.

30 km (18 mi) southeast of Rosalind Bank is Serranilla Bank. The cays on it are the closest pieces of dry land.

Several countries claim that their exclusive economic zones extend over Rosalind Bank, including Colombia, Nicaragua, Honduras, the United States, and Jamaica.

See also 
 List of Guano Island claims
 Placer (geography)

References

External links
Sailing Directions, Caribbean Sea, Vol. II

Undersea banks of the Caribbean Sea
Caribbean islands claimed under the Guano Islands Act
International territorial disputes of the United States